Koutu  is a suburb of Rotorua in the Bay of Plenty Region of New Zealand's North Island. Koutu was originally a home for the people of Ngati Whakaue and Ngāti Uenukukopako and has been in existence since before the establishment of Rotorua Township.

It is located on the southwest shore of Lake Rotorua.

The suburb has one marae. Koutu or Karenga Marae and Tumahaurangi meeting house is a meeting place of the Ngāti Whakaue hapū of Ngāti Karenga.

Transport

Koutu sits on State Highway 5.

Koutu received a railway in 1894 when the Rotorua Branch line opened. It operated for over a century. In 1989, the last 2.4 km into central Rotorua closed, and a goods yard near industries in Koutu became the end of the line. Passenger trains from Auckland had ceased operating in 1968, but, ironically, a new service began two years after the railway was cut back to Koutu. Called the Geyserland Express, it first operated on 9 December 1991 and terminated at a small platform north of Lake Road; the goods yard was on the southern side of Lake Road. Passengers complained about the station being in an industrial area away from the centre of Rotorua, but proposals to rebuild the line to a more central terminus never came to fruition. Goods trains ceased in 2000 and Tranz Rail cancelled the Geyserland Express in October 2001 after it failed to find a new operator to buy the service. The railway has been mothballed ever since; the tracks to Koutu remain in place but disused, while a passenger shelter on the platform has been removed.

Demographics

Koutu had a population of 2,094 at the 2018 New Zealand census, an increase of 264 people (14.4%) since the 2013 census, and an increase of 246 people (13.3%) since the 2006 census. There were 639 households, comprising 1,035 males and 1,059 females, giving a sex ratio of 0.98 males per female. The median age was 30.2 years (compared with 37.4 years nationally), with 543 people (25.9%) aged under 15 years, 498 (23.8%) aged 15 to 29, 828 (39.5%) aged 30 to 64, and 222 (10.6%) aged 65 or older.

Ethnicities were 40.3% European/Pākehā, 72.3% Māori, 8.9% Pacific peoples, 5.7% Asian, and 0.7% other ethnicities. People may identify with more than one ethnicity.

The percentage of people born overseas was 10.2, compared with 27.1% nationally.

Although some people chose not to answer the census's question about religious affiliation, 44.1% had no religion, 39.1% were Christian, 5.3% had Māori religious beliefs, 0.7% were Hindu, 0.4% were Buddhist and 3.0% had other religions.

Of those at least 15 years old, 219 (14.1%) people had a bachelor's or higher degree, and 294 (19.0%) people had no formal qualifications. The median income was $23,500, compared with $31,800 nationally. 111 people (7.2%) earned over $70,000 compared to 17.2% nationally. The employment status of those at least 15 was that 669 (43.1%) people were employed full-time, 252 (16.2%) were part-time, and 156 (10.1%) were unemployed.

References

Suburbs of Rotorua
Populated places in the Bay of Plenty Region
Populated places on Lake Rotorua